Ammos itane... (Greek: Άμμος ήτανε...) is a studio album by popular Greek singer Marinella. It was entirely composed by Nikos Antypas in a folk style, with lyrics by Lina Nikolakopoulou. Released on 30 March 2004 in Greece and Cyprus by EMI Records, the album went gold, selling over 20,000 units.

Track listing 
 "Mesimeri" (Μεσημέρι; Νoon) – 5:26
 "Gialini kardia (Ammos itane...)" (Γυάλινη καρδιά; Heart of glass) – 3:53
 "Thavmata" (Θαύματα; Miracles) – (Lyrics by Nikos Antypas) – 4:17
 "Yparchoune dromoi" (Υπάρχουνε δρόμοι; There are streets) – 4:38
 "Ah na xypnousa" (Αχ να ξυπνούσα; Ah, if I could wake up) – 3:28
 "Floga" (Φλόγα; Flame) – 3:39
 "Skala" (Σκάλα; Staircase) – 3:51
 "Sta cheria tis vradias" (Στα χέρια της βραδιάς; In the hands of the night) – 4:01
 "Na leei t' onoma sou" (Να λέει τ' όνομα σου; To say your name) – 3:03
 "To louloudi" (Το λουλούδι; The flower) – 3:58
 "Mesotichia" (Μεσοτοιχία; Party wall) – 3:03

Music videos 
 "Mesimeri" - Director: Nikos Soulis
 "Gialini kardia (Ammos itane...)" - Director: Nikos Soulis
 "Thavmata" - Director: Nikos Soulis

Personnel 
 Marinella - vocals, background vocals
 Argiris Koukas - background vocals on track 10
 Nikos Antypas - arranger, conductor
 Minos EMI - producer 
 Yiannis Smyrneos - recording engineer
 Dinos Diamantopoulos - photographer
 Achilleas Haritos - make-up artist
 Dimitris Th. Arvanitis - artwork

References

2004 albums
Greek-language albums
Marinella albums
EMI Records albums
Minos EMI albums